Krystina Helena Jaczek  is a Canadian physician and Liberal politician, currently serving as the Member of Parliament for Markham—Stouffville in the House of Commons of Canada and as the Minister of Public Services and Procurement and Receiver General for Canada.

In October 2021, Jaczek was appointed Minister responsible for the Federal Economic Development Agency for Southern Ontario (FedDev Ontario) in the Cabinet of Canada. Before entering federal politics in 2019, Jaczek served as a Member of the Legislative Assembly of Ontario from 2007 to 2018 representing Oak Ridges—Markham. She served as Minister of Community and Social Services from 2014 until 2018 and as Minister of Health and Long-Term Care in 2018, under the leadership of Kathleen Wynne.

Background
Jaczek was born in England to a Polish father and an English mother, and emigrated to Canada in 1963 at age 12. She received her medical degree and Masters of Health Science from the University of Toronto and later a Masters of Business Administration from York University. After many years in general practice on staff at Women's College Hospital in Toronto, she then served as chief medical officer of health in York Region for 18 years. Through the years, she has sat on the boards of many community agencies.

Politics

Ontario Provincial politics
In 2003, Jaczek ran as the Liberal candidate in the riding of Oak Ridges. Issues included tax rates and health care. She lost to incumbent Frank Klees by 2,521 votes. In 2007, Jaczek won the newly formed riding of Oak Ridges—Markham by 7,013 votes beating Conservative candidate Phil Bannon and New Democrat Janice Hagan. She was re-elected in the 2011, and 2014 elections. At the time, Oak Ridges-Markham was the most populous riding in the province until redistribution in 2018.

Parliamentary Assistant 
Jaczek was appointed as a Parliamentary assistant (PA) to the Minister of Health Promotion on October 30, 2007. On September 11, 2009, she was made PA to the Minister of Environment. In February 2013, Jaczek was appointed as PA to the Minister of Health and Long-Term Care. From 2011 to 2014, she served as chair of the Liberal Caucus, under the premierships of both Dalton McGuinty and Kathleen Wynne. Jaczek was a member of several Standing Committees: Public Accounts, Social Policy, Government Agencies, Finance and Economic Affairs.

Jaczek was also a member of the Select Committee on Mental Health and Addictions. This special Committee held public hearings around the province, visiting mental health and addictions facilities and several First Nations communities to better understand the Mental Health and Addictions program challenges facing Ontario.

Private Member's Bills 
Jaczek brought forward several Private Member's Bills. In 2009, she proposed a private member's bill, Bill 117, that would have prohibited riders under the age of 15 from riding motorcycles. In September 2010, she co-sponsored a private member's bill with PC and NDP MPPs to amend the Arthur Wishart Act (Franchise Disclosure) 2000, to better protect prospective franchisees. In March 2012, Jaczek introduced a private member's bill, Bill 40, to proclaim March 26 Epilepsy Awareness Day. She also introduced a private member's resolution to encourage organ donations. In February 2013, she introduced Bill 16, "An Act to amend the Municipal Act, 2001 to provide that the head of council of The Regional Municipality of York must be elected." On June 6, 2013, the bill received the support of all three parties, but it died on the order paper because of the 2014 Ontario General Election. However, in November 2016, the government introduced legislation that included a provision to ensure the direct election of chair and CEO of the Regional Municipality of York. This was subsequently overturned by the incoming PC government of Premier Doug Ford.

Cabinet Appointment 
On June 24, 2014, she was appointed by Premier Kathleen Wynne as the Minister of Community and Social Services and was the Vice Chair of Health, Education and Social Policy Cabinet Committee.

As a Cabinet Minister, Jaczek led the government's plan to reform social assistance, which includes overseeing Ontario's Basic Income Pilot as well as the establishment of the Income Security Reform Working Group who was tasked with developing ideas for a more holistic, client-centred approach to a broader income security. Jaczek has also overseen considerable reform in the developmental services sector, which includes the closing of all sheltered workshops in Ontario and has led the implementation of Ontario's Strategy to End Human Trafficking.

Jaczek was appointed Chair of Cabinet in addition to her role as Minister of Community and Social Services on January 17, 2018.

On February 26, 2018, she was appointed Minister of Health and Long-Term Care. During her time as Minister, the provincial government made an investment of $2.1 billion in mental health and addiction services. This was the largest provincial investment in mental health and addictions in Canadian history. The purpose of the funding was  improving the quality of and access to community-based services, including the creation of 15 additional youth wellness hubs and more supportive housing.

In the 2018 general election, Jaczek ran for re-election in the new district of Markham—Stouffville which encompassed the eastern portion of her old riding, but was defeated by Progressive Conservative Paul Calandra.

Federal politics
In June 2019, there was speculation that Jaczek might enter federal politics and run as a Liberal Party of Canada candidate in Markham—Stouffville in the 2019 Canadian federal election, against the incumbent Independent MP Jane Philpott. In July 2019, Jaczek announced that she would be seeking the Liberal Party nomination in the riding.

During the 43rd Canadian Parliament, Jaczek introduced one private members bill, Bill C-303 An Act to establish a national strategy for health data collection, which sought to require the Minister of Health to develop a national strategy for the collection of health data, including the creation a national public health database for the purposes of research and policy development. though the Parliament ended before it was brought to a vote. In Budget 2022, the federal government committed to working with provinces and territories to ensure that Canada's healthcare system is underpinned by health data that will support health care system improvements and Canadians' access to their own personal data.

Jaczek served on the Standing Committee on Industry, Science and Technology (INDU) and the Standing Committee on Transport, Infrastructure and Communities (TRAN). During the COVID-19 pandemic, Jaczek was invited to take part in the Standing Committee on Health.

On September 20, 2021, Jaczek was re-elected as the Member of Parliament for Markham—Stouffville.

Contributions to Health Committee during COVID-19
As part of the Standing Committee on Health, Jaczek used her expertise in medicine and public health to contribute to Canada's response to COVID-19, within the country and globally. She advocated for funding transparency, greater safety on airlines and better public health standards in the agricultural sector.

Cabinet Appointment
On October 16, 2021, Jaczek was appointed as the Minister responsible for the Federal Economic Development Agency for Southern Ontario. Jaczek also serves as the vice-chair of the Treasury Board, Vice-chair of the Cabinet Committee on Reconciliation and a member of the Cabinet Committee on Operations, and the Cabinet Committee for Economy, Inclusion and Climate "A".

On August 31, 2022, Jaczek swapped portfolios with Filomena Tassi, becoming Minister of Public Services and Procurement and Receiver General for Canada while Tassi became Minister responsible for the Federal Economic Development Agency for Southern Ontario; the cabinet shuffle had been held at Tassi's request, having asked to be moved to a position with a lighter workload in order to deal with a family health matter.

Awards and honours
 1996: Jaczek received the Distinguished Service Award from the Association of Local Public Health Agencies. 
 1997: Jaczek was a recipient of the Outstanding Alumni Mentor Award from the University of Toronto's Public Health Sciences Alumni Association. 
 2000: "In Celebration of Women" for medical leadership in York Region. 
 In 2005, she received an Award for Environmental Planning from the Canadian Institute of Planners. 
 In 2016, she received the Ontario Psychological Association Public Service Award, as well as, the Ontario Medical Association, Life Membership Award. 
 In April 2017, she was awarded the Helen Keller Award by the Canadian Foundation for Physically Disabled Persons and the Canadian Helen Keller Centre for the contributions she has made to hearing and visually impaired Ontarians. 
In November 2021, she received a Life Membership from The College of Family Physicians of Canada.

Electoral record

Federal

Provincial

References

External links

 
Private website

1950 births
20th-century Canadian physicians
21st-century Canadian physicians
21st-century Canadian politicians
21st-century Canadian women politicians
Canadian women physicians
Canadian people of Polish descent
English emigrants to Canada
Health ministers of Ontario
Living people
Liberal Party of Canada MPs
Members of the 29th Canadian Ministry
Members of the King's Privy Council for Canada
Members of the Executive Council of Ontario
Members of the House of Commons of Canada from Ontario
Ontario Liberal Party MPPs
University of Toronto alumni
Women government ministers of Canada
Women members of the House of Commons of Canada
Women MPPs in Ontario
York University alumni
20th-century women physicians
21st-century women physicians
People from East Gwillimbury
20th-century Canadian women scientists